The 2020 World trials season consisted of eight trials events with four main classes: Trial GP, Trial 2, Women's and Women's 2. It began on 5 September, with round one in Isola, France and ended with round 8 in Lazzate, Italy on 11 October.

Season summary
Toni Bou would claim his fourteenth outdoor World trials championship in 2020.

Matteo Grattarola would claim his second World outdoor title, winning the Trial 2 championship in 2020.

Emma Bristow would claim her seventh outdoor World trials championship in 2020.

2020 World trials season calendar

Scoring system
Points were awarded to the top fifteen finishers in each class. All eight rounds counted for the World GP and Trial 2 classes, all six rounds in Women's and Women's 2 classes were counted.

Trial GP final standings 

{|
|

Trial 2 final standings 

{|
|

Women's final standings

{|
|

Women's 2 final standings 

{|
|

References

Motorcycle trials
2020 in motorcycle sport